2012 Nadeshiko League Cup Final was the 7th final of the Nadeshiko League Cup competition. The final was played at Omiya Football Stadium in Saitama on September 9, 2012. Nippon TV Beleza won the championship.

Overview
Nippon TV Beleza won their 3rd title, by defeating INAC Kobe Leonessa 3–2 with Asano Nagasato and Yayoi Kobayashi goal.

Match details

See also
2012 Nadeshiko League Cup

References

Nadeshiko League Cup
2012 in Japanese women's football